191st Regional Support Group (191st RSG) is a regional support group of the Puerto Rico Army National Guard. The unit's federal (MTOE/TDA) mission is '..Deploys to provide contingency and expeditionary Base Operations Support, with responsibilities for managing facilities, providing administrative and logistical support of soldier services, and ensuring the security of personnel and facilities on a base camp.' The unit has been in command of the Joint Task Force Guantanamo Headquarters and Headquarters Company since its arrival in December 2008. Their mission while deployed is expansive, ranging from service member safety to housing issues. In addition to its far-reaching responsibilities, the group has also had to learn to work with and rely on one another, since the unit was formed shortly before deploying.

References

Support groups of the United States Army
Military units and formations in Puerto Rico
Puerto Rico Army National Guard